The ICC Women's ODI Team of the Year is an honour awarded each year by the International Cricket Council. It recognizes the top women's cricket players from around the world in the ODI format of the game. The team does not actually compete, but exists solely as an honorary entity.

List

Winners

Players marked bold won the ICC Women's ODI Cricketer of the Year in that respective year:

Appearances by player
Players marked bold are still active in ODI matches and years marked bold indicate they won the ICC Women's ODI Cricketer of the Year in that respective year:

Appearances by nation

See also

 ICC Men's ODI Team of the Year
ICC Women's T20I Team of the Year
ICC Men's T20I Team of the Year

References

External links

International Cricket Council awards and rankings